Ella Al-Shamahi is an explorer, paleoanthropologist, evolutionary biologist, writer and stand-up comic. She specialises in the study of Neanderthals. She is also the presenter and producer of BBC2's Neanderthals: Meet Your Ancestors. She is a Trustee of the International Association for the Study of Arabia.

Early life and career 
Al-Shamahi grew up in Birmingham, United Kingdom and has Yemeni and Syrian ancestry. She has a degree from Imperial College London and is currently doing a PhD at University College London in the Department of Anthropology. In 2015 she was named a National Geographic Emerging Explorer. She is a Trustee of the International Association for the Study of Arabia, which promotes research relating to the cultural and natural heritage of the Arabian Peninsula.

Expeditions 
Al-Shamahi specialises in finding fossils in Palaeolithic caves in unstable and hostile territories, such as Syria, Iraq, Nagorno-Karabakh and Yemen. In her TED talk, Al-Shamahi describes her reconnaissance expedition to Socotra, a Yemeni island. The expedition was funded by the MBI Al Jaber Foundation as part of their ongoing support for the heritage of Yemen. She was prohibited from travelling to mainland Yemen, as it was a no-fly zone, but found that the island was relatively safe. However, she had to find a way to get to the island. In early 2018 her team set off on a cement cargo ship through the Indian Ocean, where they were at risk of running into Somali pirates, and reached Socotra after three days. Besides Al-Shamahi, the team included Rhys Thwaites-Jones, Martin Edstrom, and Leon McCarron.

TV programmes and media

Neanderthals - Meet Your Ancestors (2018)
In 2018 Al-Shamahi presented a BBC Two programme, Neanderthals - Meet Your Ancestors, investigating what the Neanderthal species of archaic humans looked like and how they lived in their Ice Age world. It turns out that they weren't knuckle-dragging ape-men at all. In fact, they were faster, smarter, better looking and much more like us than we ever thought. She worked with Andy Serkis on the programme.

Horizon - Body Clock (2019)
In 2019 Al-Shamahi presented an episode for Horizon called Body Clock: What Makes Us Tick?, for which she locked a test subject in an underground bunker for 10 days.

Jungle Mystery: Lost Kingdoms of the Amazon (2020)
In 2020 Al-Shamahi presented a Channel 4 documentary Jungle Mystery: Lost Kingdoms of the Amazon investigating various aspects of current and ancient indigenous communities and tribes in the Amazon.

In episode 2 of the three-part series, she reports on the discovery of one of the world’s largest collections of prehistoric rock art that has been discovered in the Amazonian rainforest. The site is in the Serranía de la Lindosa region in Colombia where other rock art has been found.

Waterhole (2020)
In 2020 Al-Shamahi and well-known naturalist Chris Packham, presented a BBC Two natural history documentary centred on a waterhole in the Mwiba Wildlife Reserve in northern Tanzania. The waterhole was especially created to allow close-up filming of the lives of some of Africa’s most iconic animals.

Tutankhamun: Secrets of the Tomb (2022)
In 2022 Al-Shamahi presented a Channel 4 documentary Tutankhamun: Secrets of the Tomb. The two-part series explores the curse of the Egyptian pharaoh's tomb, and in particular whether or not there might be any scientific truth behind the legend.

What Killed the Whale? (2022)
In 2022 Al-Shamahi presented a Channel 4 commissioned investigative documentary, What Killed the Whale? Great numbers of whales are washed up and die on UK beaches every year. Al-Shamahi, along with the country’s leading frontline science organisations,  investigated the causes of the crisis - how much is due to pollution, fishing, ship strikes and other human activities?

TED
In 2019 Al-Shamahi gave a TED talk in which she described her expedition to the Yemeni island of Socotra. It is one of the most biodiverse places on earth, and she makes the case for scientists to explore the unstable regions that could be home to incredible discoveries.

Comedy
In her spare time, Al-Shamahi is a stand-up comic and has performed several shows at the Edinburgh Fringe Festival. Al-Shamahi says comedy is her coping strategy and a way to make the more esoteric parts of her work understandable to laypeople. “Some of the places I go are really dark, so it’s a good way of dealing with this stuff”.

Books
Al-Shamahi’s book, The Handshake: A Gripping History, was published in 2021. It presents an historical overview of the human handshake from its origins (at least seven million years ago) all the way to its sudden disappearance in March 2020 (due to the COVID-19 pandemic). One reviewer called the book “a fabulously sparky, wide-ranging and horizon-broadening little study, examining this most ancient of human gestures from a multitude of viewpoints”.

Personal life
Al-Shamahi married at the age of 21 and lived in Surrey; her marriage lasted five years.

References

External links 
 Ella Al-Shamahi; Soho Agency
 
 TED Talk: The fascinating (and dangerous) places scientists aren't exploring

Living people
1980s births
People from Birmingham, West Midlands
Science communicators
British paleoanthropologists
Women evolutionary biologists
Evolutionary biologists
British explorers
British stand-up comedians
BBC television presenters
BBC television producers
English people of Yemeni descent
English people of Syrian descent
Alumni of University College London
Alumni of Imperial College London